2018 in Bellator MMA was the tenth year in the history of Bellator MMA, a mixed martial arts promotion based in the United States. Bellator held 23 events in 2015.

Background
In addition to airing cards on the newly-rebranded Paramount Network (formally Spike), Bellator would sign a multi-year deal with streaming service DAZN. Their partnership began with Bellator 206, which was broadcast exclusively on DAZN. Bellator would hold its 200th numbered event on May 25, 2018.

Bellator Heavyweight World Grand Prix Tournament
In 2018, Bellator organised the 2018–2019 Heavyweight Grand Prix that will crown the Bellator Heavyweight champion. This belt was vacated in May 2016 by Vitaly Minakov. Minakov had not defended the title since April 2014.

Bellator Welterweight World Grand Prix Tournament
In 2018, Bellator organised the 2018–2019 Welterweight Grand Prix that will crown the Bellator Welterweight champion. All fights will be five rounds. If Rory MacDonald were to lose, the victor will be declared lineal champion until he loses or wins the tournament and becomes undisputed champion.

Lorenz Larkin versus Ion Pascu took place to determine an tournament alternate, with Larkin winning to stand as the alternate.
Champion Rory MacDonald retained his title in a majority draw. He advanced to fight Neiman Gracie.

Bellator 192

Bellator 192: Rampage vs. Sonnen took place on January 20, 2018 at The Forum in Inglewood, California. The event aired on Paramount Network as the first Bellator event to air on the network since its re-branding from Spike.

Background

This card featured the first bout in the 2018 Bellator Heavyweight World Grand Prix Tournament.

Results

Bellator 193

Bellator 193: Larkin vs. Gonzalez took place on January 26, 2018 at the Pechanga Resort and Casino in Temecula, California. The event aired live in prime time on Paramount Network.

Background

A Lightweight bout between Eugene Correa and Joao Paulo Faria was planned for the undercard of this event, but was canceled for undisclosed reasons.

Despite a 180-pound catchweight limit installed in the main event, headliner Fernando Gonzalez still missed weight. It was his third consecutive weight cut miss.

Results

Bellator 194

Bellator 194: Mitrione vs. Nelson 2 took place on February 16, 2018 at the Mohegan Sun Arena in Uncasville, Connecticut. The event aired live in prime time on Paramount Network.

Background

This card featured the second bout in the 2018 Bellator Heavyweight World Grand Prix Tournament. Matt Mitrione and Roy Nelson previously fought under the UFC banner in December 2012 with Nelson winning by TKO in the first round.

Results

Bellator 195

Bellator 195: Caldwell vs. Higo took place on March 2, 2018 at the WinStar World Casino in Thackerville, Oklahoma. The event aired live in prime time on Paramount Network.

Background

The event was headlined by Bantamweight champion Darrion Caldwell making the first defense of his title against Pitbull brothers' protege Leandro Higo.

Results

Bellator Monster Energy Fight Series: Atlanta

Bellator Monster Energy Fight Series: Atlanta was the fifth installment of the series held on March 3, 2018 at the Georgia World Congress Center in Atlanta, Georgia prior to the Monster Energy AMA Supercross.

Results

Bellator 196

Bellator 196: Henderson vs. Huerta took place on April 6, 2018 at BOK Hall in Budapest, Hungary. The event aired on tape delay in prime time on Paramount Network.

Background

Bellator 196 featured a lightweight main event between Benson Henderson and Roger Huerta, returning to the promotion after a 7 year absence. The original main event between Ádám Borics and James Gallagher was cancelled after a wrist injury was sustained by Gallagher during training.

Results

Bellator 197

Bellator 197: Chandler vs. Girtz took place on April 13, 2018 at the Family Arena in St. Charles, Missouri. The event aired live in prime time on Paramount Network.

Background

Michael Chandler was scheduled to face Brent Primus in a rematch for the Lightweight title. However, on March 21, Primus pulled out of the fight due to a knee injury. As a result, Brandon Girtz stepped in as a replacement.

Results

Bellator 198

Bellator 198: Fedor vs. Mir took place on April 28, 2018 at the Allstate Arena in Rosemont, Illinois. The event aired live in prime time on Paramount Network.

Background

Rafael Lovato Jr. was originally scheduled to face John Salter on this card. However, Salter was pulled by the Illinois Athletic Commission due to an eye issue on April 24 and replaced by Gerald Harris. Due to the lateness of the rebooking, the bout was contested at a catchweight of 188 pounds.

Results

Bellator 199

Bellator 199: Bader vs. King Mo took place on  May 12, 2018 at the SAP Center in San Jose, California. The event aired live in prime time on Paramount Network.

Background

This card featured the fourth and final bout in the opening round of the 2018 Bellator Heavyweight World Grand Prix Tournament as Light Heavyweight Champion Ryan Bader moved up to face Muhammed Lawal.

Results

Bellator 200

Bellator 200: Carvalho vs. Mousasi took place on May 25, 2018 at the SSE Arena, Wembley in London, England.  The event aired on tape delay in prime time on Paramount Network.

Background

This card was expected to be headlined by a rematch between Mirko Cro Cop and Roy Nelson. The pair previously fought in October 2011 at UFC 137 with Nelson winning by TKO. The bout was also expected to serve as an alternate bout for the 2018 Bellator Heavyweight World Grand Prix Tournament. However, the bout was scrapped during the week leading up to the event as Cro Cop pulled out of the fight citing an injury.

Results

Bellator 201

Bellator 201: Macfarlane vs. Lara took place on June 29, 2018 at the Pechanga Resort and Casino in Temecula, California. The event aired live in prime time on Paramount Network.

Background

Results

Bellator 202

Bellator 202: Budd vs. Nogueira took place on July 13, 2018 at the WinStar World Casino in Thackerville, Oklahoma. The event aired live in prime time on Paramount Network.

Background

Originally Stephanie Geltmacher was scheduled to face Deborah Kouzmin. However, on the week of the event Kouzmin announced that she was injured. Bellator could not find a replacement for Geltmacher in time for the event.

Results

Bellator 203

Bellator 203: Pitbull vs. Weichel 2 took place on July 14, 2018 at the Foro Italico in Rome, Italy.  The event aired via tape delay in prime time on Paramount Network.

Background

The main event featured a rematch between Featherweight champion Patricio Freire and challenger Daniel Weichel. The pair previously met at Bellator 138 in June 2015, where Freire won via knockout in the second round.

Results

Bellator 204

Bellator 204: Caldwell vs. Lahat  took place on August 17, 2018 at the Sanford Pentagon in Sioux Falls, South Dakota.  The event aired live in prime time on Paramount Network.

Background

The event featured Bellator Bantamweight Champion Darrion Caldwell moving up to Featherweight as he fought Noad Lahat in a non-title bout.

James Gallagher competed at Bantamweight for the first time as he fought Bellator newcomer Ricky Bandejas.

Results

Bellator 205

Bellator 205: McKee vs. Macapá took place on September 21, 2018 at the CenturyLink Arena in Boise, Idaho. The event aired live on Paramount Network and DAZN.

Background

The event was expected to see a featherweight main event featuring A.J. McKee and former champion Pat Curran, but Curran was pulled due to injury. McKee instead faced John Macapá.

Goiti Yamaguchi was expected to fight Patricky Freire on the card but pulled out before the fight due to injury. Freire instead faced Roger Huerta.

Results

Bellator 206

Bellator 206: Mousasi vs. MacDonald took place on September 29, 2018 at the SAP Center in San Jose, California. The event streamed live on DAZN in the United States and all other regions previously served by the service, including Austria, Canada, Germany, Italy, Switzerland, and Japan, as part of a new agreement giving the service rights to seven exclusive cards per-year.

In the United Kingdom, Bellator 206 was televised by Viacom-owned Channel 5, but the telecast ceased transmission at 6:00 a.m. (in favour of preschool programming) before the main event, due to watershed regulations.

Background

The event saw Bellator welterweight champion Rory MacDonald move up to the middleweight division to challenge Bellator middleweight champion Gegard Mousasi for the Bellator middleweight title. MacDonald was attempting to become the second multi-division champion in Bellator history, after former Bellator bantamweight and featherweight champion Joe Warren.

In addition, former UFC light heavyweight champion Quinton Jackson met rival and former PRIDE FC middleweight champion Wanderlei Silva for the fourth time in their respective careers. Going into this fight, Silva held a 2–1 advantage in the series.

This event featured the start of Bellator's inaugural welterweight grand prix tournament. Fighters expected to participate in the tournament are Rory MacDonald, Jon Fitch, Douglas Lima, Andrey Koreshkov, Paul Daley, Michael Page, Neiman Gracie, Ed Ruth, Lorenz Larkin, and Erick Silva, who replaced Yaroslav Amosov.

Don Mohammed and Salvador Becerra were scheduled to face each other in a Lightweight bout on the undercard. However, the bout was cancelled the week of the fight for undisclosed reasons.

At weight-ins, Ricky Abdelaziz weighed in at 147.3 pounds, 1.3 pounds over the featherweight non-title fight upper limit of 146 pounds. As a result, the bout proceeded catchweight. Abdelaziz was fined 20 percent of his purse which 10% went to his opponent, Laird Anderson, and 10% went to California State Athletic Commission. The bout between DeMarco Villalona and Abraham Vaesau was cancelled after Villalona did not make weight.

Results

Bellator 207

Bellator 207: Mitrione vs. Bader took place on October 12, 2018 at the Mohegan Sun Arena in Uncasville, Connecticut. The event was live on Paramount Network and DAZN.

Background

The event saw a semi-final round bout in the Bellator Heavyweight World Grand Prix as Matt Mitrione took on current Bellator Light Heavyweight Champion Ryan Bader.

Erick Silva was expected to make his promotional debut at this event facing Lorenz Larkin in a Welterweight World Grand Prix alternate bout, but Silva pulled out due to injury. He was replaced by the Romanian fighter Ion Pascu.

Results

Bellator 208

Bellator 208: Fedor vs. Sonnen took place on October 13, 2018 at Nassau Coliseum in Uniondale, New York. The event aired live on Paramount Network and DAZN.

Background

The event saw a semi-final bout in the Bellator Heavyweight World Grand Prix between Fedor Emelianenko and Chael Sonnen.

Robson Gracie Jr. was scheduled to make his professional MMA debut on this card against Jamal Pottinger. However, the bout was cancelled after Pottinger missed weight. A featherweight bout between Frank Buenafuente and James Gonzalez was also cancelled when both fighters came over the weight limit.

Results

Bellator 209

Bellator 209: Pitbull vs. Sanchez took place on November 15, 2018 at the Menora Mivtachim Arena in Tel Aviv, Israel. The event aired on November 16, 2018 via tape delay on Paramount Network.

Background

The event featured a bout for the Bellator Featherweight Championship between champion Patrício Freire and Emmanuel Sanchez.

Haim Gozali fought Ryan Couture at the event. The two met at Bellator 180 where Couture won by a unanimous decision.

On August 20, 2018, it was reported that Olga Rubin is scheduled to meet Cindy Dandois at this event.

The event featured Vadim Nemkov coming off a spectacular win over former Bellator Light Heavyweight Champion Liam McGeary as he returned to face former Bellator Light Heavyweight champion Phil Davis.

Results

Bellator 210

Bellator 210: Njokuani vs. Salter took place on November 30, 2018 at the WinStar World Casino and Resort in Thackerville, Oklahoma. The event aired live on Paramount Network and DAZN.

Background

The event was to feature a middleweight bout between Melvin Manhoef and Chidi Njokuani as the main event. However, on November 1, it was announced that Manhoef had withdrawn from the fight due to injury and was replaced by John Salter.

It was announced on October 17, 2018, a featherweight matchup between Jeremy Spoon, who makes his Bellator return, and Juan Archuleta.

On October 26, 2018, it was reported that David Rickels is scheduled to face Bomba Vasconcelos at the welterweight bout at this event.

It was announced on October 29, 2018, a women's flyweight bout is scheduled between Bruna Ellen  and Kristina Williams at this event.

On October 30, 2018 it was reported that a middleweight bout between Joe Schilling and Jose Alfredo Leija would take place at this event. Leija was later replaced by Will Morris.

Results

Bellator 211

Bellator 211: Sakara vs. Kauppinen took place on December 1, 2018 at the RDS Stadium in Genoa, Italy. The event aired live on Paramount Network and DAZN.

Background

The event featured a light heavyweight bout between Alessio Sakara and Kent Kauppinen as the main event.

A title fight between current Bellator Kickboxing featherweight champion Gabriel Varga and Shan Cangelosi also took place on the card.

On October 30, 2018, a welterweight bout between Kiefer Crosbie and Orlando D'Ambrosio was announced for this event.

A lightweight bout between Italy's Luca Vitali and SBG Ireland prospect Luka Jelcic was scheduled for the event. However, Jelcic withdrew and was replaced by Pedro Carvalho.

Results

Bellator 212

Bellator and USO Present: Primus vs. Chandler 2 took place on December 14, 2018 at the Neal S. Blaisdell Arena in Honolulu, Hawaii in conjunction with the USO. The event was live on Paramount Network and DAZN.

Background

The event featured a Bellator Lightweight Championship bout between the champion Brent Primus and former champion Michael Chandler. The rematch was scheduled for Bellator 197, but Primus pulled out due to injury.

A women's flyweight bout between former title contender Alejandra Lara and Juliana Velasquez was also announced for the card.

On November 19, 2018, it was announced Sam Sicilia will face Derek Campos at this event.

Results

Bellator 213

Bellator 213: Macfarlane vs. Létourneau took place on December 15, 2018 at the Neal S. Blaisdell Arena in Honolulu, Hawaii. The event was live on DAZN.

Background

The event featured Honolulu native Ilima-Lei Macfarlane defending the Bellator Women's Flyweight Championship against UFC veteran Valérie Létourneau.

A middleweight bout between former champion Rafael Carvalho and UFC veteran and former UFC Light Heavyweight Champion Lyoto Machida took place at the event.

A Bellator Welterweight Grand Prix quarterfinal bout between Neiman Gracie and Ed Ruth also took place.

Bellator President Scott Coker announced on Monday, September 17, 2018 that King Mo would face former Bellator light heavyweight champion Liam McGeary at the event.

Results

References

External links
Bellator

2018 in mixed martial arts
Bellator MMA events